Phil O'Connor (10 October 1953 – 23 September 1985) was a footballer who played as a midfielder for Australia.

He began his career as an apprentice with Southend United before dropping into the non-league ranks with Bexley United. In 1972, he returned to the Football League with Luton Town. After a loan spell with Lincoln City in the 1974–75 season, O'Connor emigrated to Australia. He quickly made his way into the Australia team, making his debut against Hong Kong on 11 August 1976 and going on to appear a total of 20 times scoring 5 goals, which included three appearances against England in 1983.

A fee of $7,000 saw him move from St George to A.P.I.A. Leichhardt for the 1980 National Soccer League season, netting a 14th minute debut goal in the club's 2-1 over Adelaide City at Lambert Park (Leichhardt) on 9 March 1980. After two seasons, he moved on to join Wollongong Wolves for the 1982 National Soccer League season. On 23 September 1985, O'Connor died in a car accident when his bread van veered off the Appin Road and hit a tree, killing him instantly.

References

External links 
 Lincoln City profile
 Australian career history

1953 births
1985 deaths
Association football midfielders
Australian soccer players
Australia international soccer players
National Soccer League (Australia) players
English Football League players
APIA Leichhardt FC players
Blacktown City FC players
Lincoln City F.C. players
Luton Town F.C. players
Southend United F.C. players
Bexley United F.C. players
Irish emigrants to Australia
English emigrants to Australia